Lidija Cvijić (born 25 May 1998) is a Serbian handball player for Achenheim Truchtersheim Handball and the Serbian national team.

References

1998 births
Living people
Serbian female handball players